Stephen O'Brien (born 27 February 1991) is an Irish Gaelic footballer who plays for the Kenmare Shamrocks club and at senior level for the Kerry county team since 2014.

Underage and junior
He joined the county's under-21 team in 2011. Kerry sustained a 22-point loss to Cork in the Munster final. He was still underage in 2012 and for the second year in a row he was on the losing side in a Munster final to Cork after extra time.

Senior
He made his debut for Kerry in the 2014 Munster Senior Football Championship semi-final against Clare and scored two points. He lined out in a first Munster Senior Football Championship when they faced Cork, he scored a point in a 0-24 to 0-12 win and a first Munster title. He missed out on Kerry's win over Galway in the All-Ireland quarter-final. He was back in the starting line up for the semi final with Mayo scoring a point in a 1-16 each draw.  An injury while out racing on his quad caused him to miss the 2014 All-Ireland Senior Football Championship semi-final replay win over Mayo. However, he started the 2014 All-Ireland Senior Football Championship Final at right half forward. 

Retirements brought new opportunities for O'Brien in 2019. He scored Kerry's first goal against Dublin in five games during a 2019 National Football League fixture in Tralee. In the 56th minute of the 2019 All-Ireland Senior Football Championship semi-final against Tyrone, O'Brien scored his fifth championship goal after intercepting a pass from Kieran McGeary, distributing the ball and running the length of the field.

Honours
Kerry
All-Ireland Senior Football Championship (2): 2014, 2022
Munster Senior Football Championship (8): 2014, 2015, 2016, 2017, 2018, 2019, 2021, 2022
National Football League (4): 2017, 2020, 2021, 2022
McGrath Cup (2): 2017, 2022

Kenmare Shamrocks
 Kerry Intermediate Football Championship (1): 
2016
 Munster Intermediate Club Football Championship (1): 
2016
 Kerry Junior Football Championship (1): 
2012
 Munster Junior Club Football Championship (1): 
2012
 All-Ireland Junior Club Football Championship (Runner Up):
2013

Kenmare District Team
 Kerry Senior Football Championship (Runner-Up)
2016

References

1991 births
Living people
Chemical engineers
Gaelic football backs
Gaelic football forwards
Kenmare Gaelic footballers
Kerry inter-county Gaelic footballers
21st-century Irish engineers
Winners of one All-Ireland medal (Gaelic football)